Vernons is a town in Saint Peter Parish, Antigua and Barbuda.

Vernons takes up 43% of Saint Peter's land area excluding the offshore islands that are also a part of the town.

Demographics 
Vernons has one enumeration district, ED 51300.

Census Data (2011)

References 

Saint Peter Parish, Antigua and Barbuda
Populated places in Antigua and Barbuda